Castle Bridge School is an English medium combined school starting from grade R - 12, situated next to National Hospital in Bloemfontein, Free State, South Africa. The Principal is Mr Tau Seheri and he has two deputies for each section of the combined school, Primary school Deputy is Mrs Oosthuizen and for the High School it is Mr Sibanda.

References

External links

Schools in the Free State (province)